Georges Schiltz (born 3 February 1901, date of death unknown) was a Luxembourgian cyclist. He competed in two events at the 1924 Summer Olympics.

References

External links
 

1901 births
Year of death missing
Luxembourgian male cyclists
Olympic cyclists of Luxembourg
Cyclists at the 1924 Summer Olympics
Sportspeople from Luxembourg City